Ruxandra Porojnicu (born 5 July 1993) is a Romanian actress. She is known for her portrayal of Alina Pop in the British soap opera Coronation Street from 2019 until 2021.

Life and career
Porojnicu was born on 5 July 1993 in Bucharest, Romania. While attending university, she spent time in America as part of her course; seeing a "different way of life" inspired her to move away. She received a degree in acting and puppetry from the Caragiale National University of Theatre and Film, and numerous theatre credits. At the age of 22, she left Romania to live in London. Porojnicu stated that although she loves Romania, she left since she felt that career opportunities there are limited.

Porojnicu has spoken about having to "start over" as she went to the United Kingdom. Upon moving, she had £300 to her name. She got a job at Pizza Express, and took acting classes. She also began working as an extra and doing modelling, some of which was unpaid, so that she could build a portfolio. Porojnicu got signed to an agency that specialised in advertisements with an acting department, where she received an audition for the role of Alina Pop on the ITV soap opera Coronation Street. She received the role, and has appeared as Alina since 2019. For her role, she was nominated for Best Newcomer at the 2019 Inside Soap Awards.

Filmography

References

External links
 

1993 births
Living people
21st-century Romanian actresses
Actresses from Bucharest
Actresses from London
Romanian television actresses
Romanian soap opera actresses
Romanian expatriates in England